At least two warships of Japan have been named Fuyushio:

, a  launched in 1962 and struck in 1980.
, a  launched in 1994 and struck in 2015.

Japanese Navy ship names
Japan Maritime Self-Defense Force ship names